Tonino Delli Colli (20 November 1923 – 16 August 2005) was an Italian cinematographer.

Biography
Cousin of Franco Delli Colli, Antonio (Tonino) Delli Colli was born in Rome, and began work at Rome's Cinecittà studio in 1938, at the age of sixteen. By the mid-1940s he was working as a cinematographer and in 1952 shot the first Italian film in colour, Totò a colori. He went on to work with a number of acclaimed and diverse directors including, Sergio Leone (The Good, the Bad and the Ugly, Once Upon a Time in the West and Once Upon a Time in America), Roman Polanski (Death and the Maiden and Bitter Moon), Louis Malle (Lacombe, Lucien), Jean-Jacques Annaud (The Name of the Rose), and Federico Fellini, whose last three films he photographed.

His collaboration with Pier Paolo Pasolini was especially fruitful: they made twelve films together, including Pasolini's debut Accattone (1961), Mamma Roma (1962), The Gospel According to St. Matthew (1964), The Decameron (1971), The Canterbury Tales (1972) and Salò o le 120 giornate di Sodoma (1976).

His last film was Roberto Benigni's Life Is Beautiful (1997), for which he won his fourth David di Donatello for Best Cinematography. In 2005 he was awarded the American Society of Cinematographers' International Achievement Award. In August of the same year, he died at home in Rome.

Tonino Delli Colli died from a heart attack in 2005 at the age of 81 in Rome, Italy.

In 2005, Delli Colli was posthumously awarded the Lifetime Achievement Award at the 13th annual Camerimage Film Festival in Łódź, Poland.

Selected filmography
 Hand of Death (1949)
 I'm the Capataz (1951)
 The Steamship Owner (1951)
 The Rival of the Empress (1951)
 Toto in Color (1952) 
 Brothers of Italy (1952)
 The White Angel (1955)
 The Friend of the Jaguar (1959)
 The Good, the Bad and the Ugly (1966)
 The Day of the Owl (1968)
 Once Upon a Time in the West (1968)
 The Decameron (1971)
 Seven Beauties (1975)
 Once Upon a Time in America (1984)
 The Name of the Rose (1986)
 Bitter Moon (1992)
 Death and the Maiden (1994)
 Life Is Beautiful (1997)

References

External links
"A Lifetime Through the Lens": article from American Cinematographer

Italian cinematographers
Film people from Rome
1923 births
2005 deaths
David di Donatello winners
Ciak d'oro winners